Andriy Volodymyrovych Kokhman (born 25 May 1990) is a Ukrainian professional footballer who plays as an attacking midfielder for Ukrainian club Prykarpattia Ivano-Frankivsk.

References

External links
 Profile on Prykarpattya Ivano-Frankivsk official website
 
 

1990 births
Living people
People from Lviv Oblast
Ukrainian footballers
Association football midfielders
FC Zorya Luhansk players
FC Kremin Kremenchuk players
FC Enerhiya Nova Kakhovka players
FC Skala Stryi (2004) players
FC Bukovyna Chernivtsi players
FC Rochyn Sosnivka players
FC Kalush players
FC Prykarpattia Ivano-Frankivsk (1998) players
FC Uzhhorod players
Ukrainian Premier League players
Ukrainian First League players
Ukrainian Second League players